Ann Lawrence Durviaux (13 August 1968 – 15 August 2021) was a Belgian jurist and academic. She was a professor of political science and criminology at the University of Liège.

Biography
Durviaux was born in Namur on 13 August 1968. She earned a law degree from the University of Liège and pursued a career as a lawyer, specializing in public and administrative law. She earned a doctorate degree in 1993 and was an assistant professor of administrative law and litigation at Liège until 2006. While at the school, she served as Vice-Dean for Teaching at the Faculty of LawShe also worked as a lawyer in Namur alongside Claire Doyen-Biver. In 2007, she became Director of the Laboratoire européen d'administration régionale et locale, a research and training laboratory for local communities.

On 15 August 2021, Durviaux was found shot dead with her mistress, Nathalie Maillet in Gouvy. Maillet's husband, Franz Dubois, was the suspected murderer, as he called the police before turning the gun on himself in an apparent suicide. Durviaux was buried in Ciney on 23 August.

References

1968 births
2021 deaths
Belgian jurists
University of Liège alumni
Academic staff of the University of Liège
People from Namur (city)
Belgian LGBT people
Murder–suicides in Europe
Belgian murder victims
People murdered in Belgium
Deaths by firearm in Belgium
2021 murders in Belgium
21st-century Belgian LGBT people